= NGO involvement in Guatemala =

NGO involvement in Guatemala includes the following.

== Guatemalan Association for Sexual Education ==
The Guatemalan Association for Sexual Education (AGES), with backing from the United States Agency for International Development (USAID), has set into motion several programs tailored to both improve the quality of the education, and the number of people getting educated. To achieve this, it was necessary to have a mix of activities that sought to “balance broad systemic improvements with specific classroom support, and institutionalisation of project activities into existing organizational units”. Two programs implemented by AGES were particularly successful in achieving these goals.

== Eduque a la Niña (Educate the Girl) ==
Traditional gender roles are still prevalent in Guatemala and this has had a negative impact on the education levels of women. Women are tasked with domestic chores and are made to work on agricultural land such that there is no perceived need for educated women. It is estimated that Guatemala has one of the lowest literacy rate in Latin America with 43 percent of all women over 15 are illiterate, compared with 28 percent of all men.

The implementation of Eduque a la Niña was to address the pressing issue of basic education for girls and inculcate in parents the importance of girls’ education. AGES funded students with a $4.30-per-month scholarship, developed close parent teacher relationship to monitor the progress of the child and offered education materials specific to girls. These schemes were put in place in hope that girls will be motivated to learn and parents would be supportive of their academic endeavours.

The schemes were well received and the provisions of scholarships were proven to be effective in encouraging girls to advance to the second grade.

== Nueva Escuela Unitaria (NEU) ==
The NEU was based on the Colombian's Escuela Nueva model. NEU schools are multi-grade schools serving rural indigenous communities. These schools use flexible individual and group study and active participation to increase the quality of education. It moved teachers away from traditional instructional teaching methods and introduced the use of small groups in the classroom. This innovation permitted students, in particular girls, to participate more actively in the classroom and have their experiences and knowledge recognised. Teachers from schools in close proximity are also required to meet regularly to "train, support and adapt learning materials".

The NEU schools were evaluated in series of studies by Chesterfield and Rubio and by Baessa, as part of the Improving Educational Quality (IEQ) Project. The study found that NEU schools retained significantly more students. The students were also able to achieve at a higher level in mathematics and reading. The active pedagogy in NEU schools contributed to emotional growth, participatory behavior, and group work. NEU teachers had greater confidence and capabilities to work in multigrade classrooms and used small group instruction. Overall parental satisfaction was higher in NEU schools citing their children's ability to read better and behave better at home.

One drawback of this program that has been noted is that the costs per NEU student is 58% higher than costs per student in standard schools. However, the higher relative costs of the NEU can be seen as reasonable due to the small percentage of national budget directed to primary schools in Guatemala. Furthermore, the improved quality of education in NEU schools led to reduced repetition and dropout rates, resulting in a 15% drop in total costs per student to complete the primary cycle.
